Ravi K. Tripathi (born 4 February) is an Indian playback singer, composer and music director. He competed on the television music reality show Indian Idol season 2 in 2006. Tripathi was the only Indian artist to have been invited to perform and represent India at the closing ceremony of Asian games 2010, in Guangzhou, China.

Career 
In 2005, Tripathi participated in the second season of Indian music reality show Indian Idol and was the top finalist. Tripathi hosted singing reality show Close Up Performer on Doordarshan in 2008. His first solo album, Baatain, was released on 26 February 2009, by Times Music which received good response and in the same year he debuted in Bollywood with the song India Se Aaya Tera Dost from Bollywood film Chandni Chowk to China. In 2010, Tripathi was invited to perform at the closing ceremony of Asian Games held in Guangzhou, China and became the only Indian performer of note after actor Raj Kapoor to have entertained the Chinese audience. His second album Sri Siddhivinayak Morya was released in the same year by Worldwide Records. He has also lent his voice to some TV shows including Ramayan.

In 2017, he composed and produced a song Main Bharat Bol Raha Hoon.

Albums
 Baatain
 More Krishna
 Shri Sidhivinayak Morya
 Kinara
 Dhuan Dhuan
 Inkaar
 Radhe Radhe

Television

Discography

Filmography

Awards and recognition
In November 2010, Tripathi was honoured by the overseas Indian community at the Hague, Holland.
In November 2016, he was received Uttar Pradesh Ratan Award by Shivpal Singh Yadav for his contribution in music industry.

References

External links
Print media news articles
Ravi K. Tripathi at Hungama.com
iTunes profile

Living people
Bollywood playback singers
Indian male composers
Year of birth missing (living people)
Musicians from Uttar Pradesh